Qamar ul Islam Raja is a Pakistani politician who was a Member of the Provincial Assembly of the Punjab, from 2008 to May 2018.

Early life and education
He was born on 6 December 1964 in Rawalpindi.

He graduated in 1987 from University of the Punjab. He obtained a degree of Bachelor of Science in Civil Engineering in 1989 from University of Engineering and Technology, Lahore.

In 2001, he completed Postgraduate Diploma in Computer Sciences. In 2005, he obtained a degrees of Master of Science and a degree of Master of Philosophy in Mass Communication in 2009.

Political career
He was elected to the Provincial Assembly of the Punjab as a candidate of Pakistan Muslim League (Q) (PML-Q) from Constituency PP-5 (Rawalpindi-V) in 2008 Pakistani general election. He received 34,252 votes and defeated Raja Anwar, a candidate of Pakistan Muslim League (N) (PML-N).

He was re-elected to the Provincial Assembly of the Punjab as a candidate of PML-N from Constituency PP-5 (Rawalpindi-V) in 2013 Pakistani general election. He received 65,445 votes and with the highest lead in the provincial assembly of the punjab he defeated Malik Sohail Ashraf, a candidate of PML-Q.

Saaf Pani case
In June 2018, he was arrested in the Saaf Pani case for allegedly awarding contract to his favorite firm. After that he released by court order as case has no worth, purely based on political victimisation.

References

Living people
1964 births
Punjab MPAs 2008–2013
Punjab MPAs 2013–2018
Pakistan Muslim League (Q) MPAs (Punjab)
Pakistan Muslim League (N) MPAs (Punjab)
University of the Punjab alumni
University of Engineering and Technology, Lahore alumni
People from Rawalpindi